Geoffrey Douglas Trappett, OAM (born 18 September 1979) is an Australian Paralympic athlete who won three medals over two Paralympics.

Early life
Trappett was born in Brisbane on 18 September 1979 with spina bifida. He grew up in the Brisbane suburb of Albany Creek and attended the  Queensland Academy of Sport.

Sporting career 
In 1999, Trappett won two gold medals and broke two national records in the Men's 100 m  and 200 m events, at the National Championships in Canberra and the Metro Challenge in Toronto, respectively. At the 2000 Sydney Paralympics, he won a gold medal in the  Men's 100 m T54 event, for which he received a Medal of the Order of Australia, and a silver medal in the Men's 4x100 m T54 event. He was coached by Brett Jones in the twelve months before the 2000 Paralympics.

In 2003 at an event in Canberra, he set a world record in the 100 m sprint; however he disqualified himself because he had made a false start that no one else had noticed. Two weeks later he ran the same event in the Gold Coast in a world-record time of 13.99 seconds. At the 2004 Athens Paralympics, he won a silver medal in the Men's 4x100 m T53–54 event.

In 2009, he was one of the first 150 people to be added to the Queensland Sport Hall of Fame.

Post Sporting Career 
In 2009 he became the Senior Engagement and Services Delivery Officer with the Cerebral Palsy League Queensland.

Trappett is an advocate for those with a disability. He founded Inclusion Moves which is involved in facilitating, awareness campaigns, advocacy  and training in the disability area.

He is married to Masako.

References

External links
Athletics Australia Results

Paralympic athletes of Australia
Athletes (track and field) at the 2000 Summer Paralympics
Athletes (track and field) at the 2004 Summer Paralympics
Medalists at the 2000 Summer Paralympics
Medalists at the 2004 Summer Paralympics
Paralympic gold medalists for Australia
Paralympic silver medalists for Australia
Paralympic medalists in athletics (track and field)
Recipients of the Medal of the Order of Australia
Australian male wheelchair racers
Athletes from Brisbane
People with spina bifida
Australian disability rights activists
1979 births
Living people